Draško Knežević (born 3 February 1993) is a Bosnian professional basketball player for Borac Banja Luka of the Championship of Bosnia and Herzegovina and the ABA League Second Division.

He was MVP of the 2016–17 Basketball Championship of Bosnia and Herzegovina.

References

External links
 Drasko Knezevic Profile
 Profile at abaliga.com
 Profile at eurobasket.com

1993 births
Point guards
Living people
ABA League players
Bosnia and Herzegovina men's basketball players
KK Bosna Royal players
OKK Borac players
KK Igokea players
KK Sutjeska players
Serbs of Bosnia and Herzegovina